Bidvest Stadium, is a multipurpose sports stadium in the Braampark, suburb of Johannesburg, South Africa.

The stadium has a dedicated field to host football matches with a capacity of 5,000 seats, and other fields to host other sports disciplines. The exact location of the stadium, is at the
Wits University campus, and it is currently used as the preferred home ground of Bidvest Wits in the Premier Soccer League.

During the 2010 FIFA World Cup, it was also used as a training venue by the Netherlands national football team.

References

External links
Stadium images at StadiumDB.com

Soccer venues in South Africa
Sports venues in Johannesburg
University of the Witwatersrand
Bidvest companies